"Celebration" is a song recorded by American singer and songwriter Madonna for her third greatest hits album of the same name (2009). It was written and produced by Madonna, Paul Oakenfold and Ian Green, with additional writing from Ciaran Gribbin. The song was released digitally on July 31, 2009 by Warner Bros. Records. Madonna collaborated with Oakenfold to develop a number of songs. Amongst all the songs developed by them, two were chosen for the greatest hits album with "Celebration" being released as the first single from it. It is a dance-oriented song with influences of Madonna's singles from the 1980s and 1990s, and consisting of a speak-sing format bridge. The lyrics of the song invite one to come and join a party.

"Celebration" received mixed reviews from contemporary critics. It peaked at number one in Bulgaria, Finland, Israel, Italy, Slovakia and Sweden, while reaching the top five in other nations, including Canada, France, Germany, Japan and the United Kingdom where it debuted at number three on the UK Singles Chart. It became Madonna's 55th entry on the US Billboard Hot 100, where it debuted and peaked at number 71, and her 40th number-one song on the dance chart.

The music video used the Benny Benassi remix of the song. It portrayed Madonna and her tour dancers solo dancing to the song. Cameo appearances were made by model Jesus Luz and in an alternative video by her daughter Lourdes. At the 2010 Grammy Awards, the song received a nomination in the Best Dance Recording category. The song was used as the closing number of The MDNA Tour (2012), in which Madonna energetically danced in a glittery outfit and, at one point, put on a pair of headphones and pantomimed scratching records with colored cubes falling in the backdrop.

Background

In March 2009, Madonna's representative Liz Rosenberg confirmed that Madonna wrote three new tracks for the compilation album, with Paul Oakenfold being confirmed as producer for two of the new songs. Attitude magazine reported in an interview with Oakenfold that the tracks he produced with Madonna are called "Broken (I'm Sorry)" and "Celebrate". He stated that the new music is "lyrically classic Madonna with an edgy modern sound." The song "Celebrate", later renamed as "Celebration", has backing music composed by Ciaran Gribbin, Ian Green and Oakenfold, with lyrics and vocal melody composed by Madonna.

According to Gribbin, Madonna approached Oakenfold, asking him what he was working on and whether he would be interested in sending her some material for which she could write lyrics. Oakenfold, along with Green and Gribbin, had been working on new tracks for his upcoming album. They sent fifteen of those tracks to Madonna. She chose "Broken" and "Celebration" from them. Then Oakenfold, Gribbin and Green developed the chord structure, arranged the backing track and added guitars, keyboards and drums. Madonna then wrote the lyrics and melody based on this backing track.

Warner Bros. Records announced "Celebration" as the lead single from the album. It was released to radio stations on August 3, 2009, with remixes having been released to dance clubs on July 24, 2009. A world premiere of the Paul Oakenfold 12" Dub version was played on the Pete Tong BBC Radio 1 show on July 24, 2009.

Composition

James Montgomery from MTV News described "Celebration" as a sleek dance-oriented track with influences of previous dance singles by Madonna from the early 90s such as, "Vogue" (1990) and "Deeper and Deeper" (1992). It has a pumping, house composition which Oakenfold described as "lyrically classic Madonna with an edgy modern sound." Jude Rogers of The Guardian described "Celebration" as a "Paul Oakenfold EDM co-write [...] with shadows of her [Madonna's] old selves". Influences of Europop are found in the song, but not to the extent of Madonna's 2005 single "Hung Up". According to a writer from the Los Angeles Times, the song has a highly energetic synth-pop groove while referencing 80s Madonna songs. The bridge is in a speak-sing format, where Madonna's voice, consisting of a little edge, declares that "I [didn't] recognize you with your clothes on."

"Celebration" is set in the time signature of common time with a dance beat tempo of 126 beats per minute. It is set in the key of B minor with Madonna's voice spanning from F3 to B4. The song has a basic sequence of Em–Fm–Bm–Bm as its chord progression. The lyrics call the listener to join in a party and celebrate. They are written in the form of an invitation, which asks one to come and join "the dance of life." Stephen M. Deusner of Pitchfork explained that the song is "personality-driven pop", meaning that the lyrics and the melody becomes immaterial to the fact that Madonna is singing the song.

Critical reception
Todd Martens from the Los Angeles Times stated that "Celebration" works as a throwaway, midsummer dance pop number. However, he felt that the song had modest goals, "at least by Madonna's standards. Even when it gets a bit risque [...] silliness rules the day. She invites us 'to the dance of life,' and coasts over the chorus." He went on to add that the song "is an effective look back, a gliding, reassuring number that she [Madonna] hasn't forgotten her beginning. But rather than instill a sense of nostalgia, everything feels a bit obligatory. The sound of an artist, hopefully, ready for the next chapter." Michael Slezak from Entertainment Weekly called the song "unapologetically dance-y" but felt "disappointed that lyrically, Madonna seems to be revisiting the 'Party! Get on the floor!' theme for the umpteenth time without even the slightest bit of linguistic flair." Chris Williams from Billboard said that "Madonna's latest single won't start any new trends, but it does return the singer to her dance-floor roots." It further added that "'Celebration' [is] a score for Madonna's retro-futuristic fan base and a nice bookend to her collection of chart glories." Medium's Richard LaBeau gave a mixed review: "clearly designed exclusively for the clubs and probably written and produced in the span of an hour, this song is hardly the best of her dance club hits, but it works much better than it needs to".

James Montgomery from MTV commented: "[The song is] all pulsing sirens, wobbly bass and four-on-the-floor beat, with an expansive electro chorus that sounds like a truckload of Nintendo Entertainment Systems exploding in unison (only sexier)." Frase McAlpine from BBC gave the song three out five stars and said: "I can't be the only person in the world who is slightly disappointed that this song isn't a jaunty '80 syn-disco rave up, in which Madge skips around in a big pink wig, like she used to in the olden days." He went on to add that "Celebration" is a decent dance track for Madonna to play on her tours. Stephen M. Deusner of Pitchfork complimented the song, calling it "personality-driven pop" in which Madonna has never sounded more convincing. Deusner added that the track sounds like "it's conjuring several of Madonna's younger selves" in its modest goal to just make people move. Sarah Crompton from The Daily Telegraph said that the song is infinitely forgettable. Popjustice named the song one of the best 100 singles of 2009. Louis Virtel of The Backlot included the song at number 65 on his list of "The 100 Greatest Madonna Songs," referring to the track as a "rollicking dance jam" that is a "perfect companion piece to [Madonna's] other testament to celebration, 'Holiday'.” Eric Henderson of Slant Magazine criticized the track, saying that it had "zero-traction" and found its lyrics as shallow.

At the 52nd Annual Grammy Awards, the song received a nomination in the Best Dance Recording category. While ranking Madonna's singles in honor of her 60th birthday, Jude Rogers from The Guardian placed the track at number 70, writing that "this Paul Oakenfold EDM co-write for her third Best-Of shadows of her old selves, unfortunately more light is required".

Chart performance
In the United States, "Celebration" debuted and peaked on the Billboard Hot 100 at number 71 on the issue dated August 22, 2009. The song became Madonna's 55th entry on the chart. It debuted on the Hot Dance Club Songs and Hot Dance Airplay charts at numbers 29 and seven, respectively. On the issue of September 26, 2009, "Celebration" became Madonna's 40th number-one song on the Hot Dance Club Songs chart, the most for an artist. The song also debuted on the Adult Pop Songs chart at number 36. "Celebration" has sold 192,000 digital downloads in the United States as of April 2010. In Canada, the song debuted at number 56 on the Canadian Hot 100 and reached a peak of five the next week, becoming the week's airplay gainer.

It also debuted at 48 in Spain and made a top-five debut at three in Finland. The next week, the song reached the top of the chart in Finland, where it remained for six non-consecutive weeks, and was certified gold by the International Federation of the Phonographic Industry. Other debuts were in Ireland at 33, and 31 in Sweden where it jumped to number-one the next week. On August 30, 2009, "Celebration" debuted at number 40 on the Australian Singles Chart. The song also debuted on the UK Singles Chart at number three on the issue dated September 20, 2009, becoming her 60th top ten single. It also became the first ever number one in the Scottish singles chart, staying at the top spot for 2 weeks there. In Italy, the song debuted at the top of the chart and was certified platinum by the Federation of the Italian Music Industry (FIMI) for shipment of 60,000 copies of the single. The song peaked at number four on the Danish Singles Chart and was certified gold by the International Federation of the Phonographic Industry for shipment of 15,000 copies of the single.

Music video

On Madonna's official website, it was reported that a music video was filmed in Milan, Italy, where "die-hard fans" showed up on July 18, 2009 for the filming of segments showcasing fans dancing and "being themselves." A similar shoot took place later in Barcelona. The video was directed by Jonas Åkerlund, who had directed Madonna's clips for the songs, "Ray of Light", "Music", "American Life" and "Jump". The Guardian reported that Madonna's daughter Lourdes appeared in the video. Madonna's official website, announced the premiere of the video to be on September 1, 2009. It was released simultaneously on music channels worldwide, and on iTunes. The video was available for free download on iTunes until Thursday, when it then went up to purchase only. It was made as free download, so that buyers are made aware of the pre-order details of the Celebration album. The clip was filmed in Milan, Italy between the dates of the 2009 leg of her Sticky & Sweet Tour. The concept of the video is in similarity to the title of the song—a celebration of Madonna's career. According to MTV, the video is a throwback to the imagery during Madonna's Erotica era.

The Benny Benassi remix of the song is used in the video which starts with Madonna asking the line "Haven't I seen you somewhere before?". The music starts and the scenes cut between Madonna and her dancers start dancing to the music of the song. Madonna wears a crystal embossed, shouldered Balmain dress with knee-high Christian Louboutin boots. While she is present in almost every frame of the camera, she does not perform choreographed dance moves. Her dance is mostly confined to casual maneuvers. The dancers on the other hand, perform choreographed moves as a solo act. As the song progresses, more dancers are shown and they ultimately reach a club. The DJ in the club is portrayed by model Jesus Luz. Madonna indulges in sensual poses with him and removes his clothes in an attempt to recognize him, as the line "I guess I don't recognize you with your clothes on" is played. The two of them brush their lips together, and Madonna moves away to the dance floor again. Lourdes makes an appearance near the end of the video. She appears in an eighties styled, polka-dotted leotard and pants, and does a back arch on the ground. Madonna is then shown on the ground on all fours, or dancing while grabbing her groin. Both Madonna's and her dancer's moves are edited to appear in fast forward. Hip hop styled dancing is showcased towards the end of the video.  The end shot of the video portrays Madonna sliding down on the ground.

Daniel Kreps from Rolling Stone commented that "the Rock and Roll Hall of Famer [Madonna] prov[es] her dance moves are still razor-sharp as she turns 51." James Montgomery from MTV complemented Madonna's dance moves in the video, and said: "She is 51, twice divorced, a mother of four and she is (quite rightfully) unashamed by any of this. Sexual politics, anyone?" Olivia Smith of the New York Daily News commented that "Madge has her family – her daughter and her lover – at her latest party, in which she's still at the hotblooded center of her life." She also noted that the video exemplifies the fact that Madonna is an artist with a long musical past. However, the tone of the video explains that Madonna is ready to leave that past and move forward. According to Smith, although Madonna has toned down her appearance, "the 51-year-old is still her pelvis-swirling overtly sexual self in her new video."

On September 17, 2009, an alternate edit of the music video ("fan version") was released via Madonna's MySpace. The video contains footage filmed in Barcelona, Spain and Milan, Italy and features fans, as well as cameo appearances by Madonna's daughter Lourdes Leon, Paul Oakenfold, and the director himself.

Live performance 

The Benny Benassi remix of "Celebration", interpolated with lyrical and musical elements of "Give It 2 Me" (2008), was performed as the final number of The MDNA Tour (2012). After Madonna finished performing "Like a Prayer" (1989), the lights went out and the bell sounds used on the beginning of "Girl Gone Wild", which opened every concert, played for a few minutes. As the song began, 3D colored cubes formed on the backdrop screens while the stage was bathed in different colored lights and lasers. Madonna came out, dressed in a Joan of Arc-inspired look with black tight pants, metallic shirt and Swarovski crystals, and sang the song while her dancers did choreographed moves all over the stage. Towards the end of the performance, they put on Beats by Dr. Dre and mimicked DJ style movements. On certain shows, Madonna's son Rocco Ritchie joined her onstage.

The performance received generally positive reviews from critics. Ben Rayner, from the Toronto Star, opined that "the rave-y, ultra-lit 'Celebration' ended the night on a note of something genuine... a celebration. A slightly guarded celebration, maybe". Jim Harrington from The Oakland Tribune gave the overall concert a negative review but stated that "It wasn't until the last two songs—"Like a Prayer" and "Celebration"—that the whole deal finally clicked". On a more critical note, Chuck Yarborough from The Plain Dealer felt that "Madonna merely sang and danced [on "Celebration"]. That's like calling a diamond a really shiny rock". The performance of the song at the November 19–20, 2012, shows in Miami, at the American Airlines Arena were recorded and released in Madonna's fourth live album, MDNA World Tour. In June 2022, to accompany the remix album release, Finally Enough Love: 50 Number Ones, Madonna performed this song at Pride at the Women of the World Party in New York City.

Track listing

 UK / EU CD Maxi-Single
 "Celebration" (Album Version) – 3:34
 "Celebration" (Oakenfold Remix) – 6:35
 "Celebration" (Benny Benassi Remix) – 5:31
 "Celebration" (Oakenfold Remix Dub) – 6:35
 "Celebration" (Benny Benassi Remix Edit) – 4:01
 "Celebration" (Johnny Vicious Club Remix) – 7:59

 German CD Maxi-Single
 "Celebration" (Album Version) – 3:34
 "Celebration" (Benny Benassi Remix) – 5:31
 "Celebration" (Benny Benassi Dub) – 6:03

 US CD Maxi-Single
 "Celebration" (Oakenfold Remix) – 6:35
 "Celebration" (Benny Benassi Remix) – 5:31
 "Celebration" (Paul Oakenfold Dub Mix) – 6:35
 "Celebration" (Benny Benassi Remix Edit) – 4:01
 "Celebration" (Benny Benassi Dub) – 6:03
 "Celebration" (Johnny Vicious Club Remix) – 7:59

 UK / European 12" Picture Disc
 "Celebration" (Album Version) – 3:34
 "Celebration" (Benny Benassi Remix) – 5:31
 "Celebration" (Paul Oakenfold Remix) – 6:35
 "Celebration" (Paul Oakenfold Dub Mix) – 6:35

 iTunes Remixes EP
 "Celebration" (Benny Benassi Remix Edit) – 4:01
 "Celebration" (Benny Benassi Remix) – 5:31
 "Celebration" (Benny Benassi Dub) – 6:03
 "Celebration" (Oakenfold Remix Dub) – 6:35
 "Celebration" (Oakenfold Remix) – 6:35
 "Celebration" (Johnny Vicious Club Remix) – 7:59

 iTunes Digital Single feat. Akon
 "Celebration" (feat. Akon) (Akon Remix) – 3:54

Credits and personnel
Credits adapted from the album's liner notes.
 Madonna – songwriter, primary vocals, producer
 Paul Oakenfold – songwriter, producer
 Ian Green – songwriter, background vocals, additional production for The Industry Sound
 Ciaran Gribbin – songwriter
 Demacio "Demo" Castellon – recording, mixing for the Demolition Crew at WEA Studios
 Ron Taylor – Pro Tools
 Nick Banns – engineer
 Chris Gehringer – mastering at Sterling Sound
 Thierry Guetta – artwork design

Charts

Weekly charts

Monthly charts

Year-end charts

Certifications and sales

Release history

See also
 Artists with the most number-ones on the U.S. Dance Club Songs chart
 List of number-one singles of 2009 (Finland)
 List of number-one hits of 2009 (Italy)
 List of number-one singles of 2009 (Scotland)
 List of number-one singles of the 2010s (Sweden)
 List of number-one dance singles of 2009 (U.S.)
 List of UK Dance Singles Chart number ones of 2009

References

Songs about parties
2009 singles
2009 songs
House music songs
Madonna songs
Music videos directed by Jonas Åkerlund
Number-one singles in Finland
Number-one singles in Hungary
Number-one singles in Israel
Number-one singles in Italy
Number-one singles in Russia
Number-one singles in Scotland
Number-one singles in Sweden
Songs written by Madonna
Songs written by Paul Oakenfold
Song recordings produced by Madonna
Song recordings produced by Paul Oakenfold
Song recordings produced by Ian Green
Warner Records singles